G-code (also RS-274) is the most widely-used computer numerical control (CNC) programming language. It is used mainly in computer-aided manufacturing to control automated machine tools, as well as from a 3D-printing slicer app. It has many variants.

G-code instructions are provided to a machine controller (industrial computer) that tells the motors where to move, how fast to move, and what path to follow. The two most common situations are that, within a machine tool such as a lathe or mill, a cutting tool is moved according to these instructions through a toolpath cutting away material to leave only the finished workpiece and/or an unfinished workpiece is precisely positioned in any of up to nine axes around the three dimensions relative to a toolpath and, either or both can move relative to each other. The same concept also extends to noncutting tools such as forming or burnishing tools, photoplotting, additive methods such as 3D printing, and measuring instruments.

Implementations
The first implementation of a numerical control programming language was developed at the MIT Servomechanisms Laboratory in the late 1950s. In the decades since, many implementations have been developed by many (commercial and noncommercial) organizations. G-code has often been used in these implementations. The main standardized version used in the United States was settled by the Electronic Industries Alliance in the early 1960s. A final revision was approved in February 1980 as RS-274-D. In other countries, the standard ISO 6983 is often used, but many European countries use other standards.  For example, DIN 66025 is used in Germany, and PN-73M-55256 and PN-93/M-55251 were formerly used in Poland.

Extensions and variations have been added independently by control manufacturers and machine tool manufacturers, and operators of a specific controller must be aware of the differences between each manufacturer's product.

One standardized version of G-code, known as BCL (Binary Cutter Language), is used only on very few machines. Developed at MIT, BCL was developed to control CNC machines in terms of straight lines and arcs.

During the 1970s through 1990s, many CNC machine tool builders attempted to overcome compatibility difficulties by standardizing on machine tool controllers built by Fanuc. Siemens was another market dominator in CNC controls, especially in Europe. In the 2010s, controller differences and incompatibility are not as troublesome because machining operations are usually developed with CAD/CAM applications that can output the appropriate G-code for a specific machine through a software tool called a post-processor (sometimes shortened to just a "post").

Some CNC machines use "conversational" programming, which is a wizard-like programming mode that either hides G-code or completely bypasses the use of G-code. Some popular examples are Okuma's Advanced One Touch (AOT), Southwestern Industries' ProtoTRAK, Mazak's Mazatrol, Hurco's Ultimax and Winmax, Haas' Intuitive Programming System (IPS), and Mori Seiki's CAPS conversational software.

G-code began as a limited language that lacked constructs such as loops, conditional operators, and programmer-declared variables with natural-word-including names (or the expressions in which to use them). It was unable to encode logic but was just a way to "connect the dots" where the programmer figured out many of the dots' locations longhand. The latest implementations of G-code include macro language capabilities somewhat closer to a high-level programming language. Additionally, all primary manufacturers (e.g., Fanuc, Siemens, Heidenhain) provide access to programmable logic controller (PLC) data, such as axis positioning data and tool data, via variables used by NC programs. These constructs make it easier to develop automation applications.

Specific codes 

G-codes, also called preparatory codes, are any word in a CNC program that begins with the letter G. Generally it is a code telling the machine tool what type of action to perform, such as:
 Rapid movement (transport the tool as quickly as possible in between cuts)
 Controlled feed in a straight line or arc
 Series of controlled feed movements that would result in a hole being bored, a workpiece cut (routed) to a specific dimension, or a profile (contour) shape added to the edge of a workpiece
 Set tool information such as offset
 Switch coordinate systems

There are other codes; the type codes can be thought of like registers in a computer.

It has been pointed out over the years that the term "G-code" is imprecise because "G" is only one of many letter addresses in the complete language. It comes from the literal sense of the term, referring to one letter address and to the specific codes that can be formed with it (for example, G00, G01, G28), but every letter of the English alphabet is used somewhere in the language.  Nevertheless, "G-code" is metonymically established as the common name of the language.

Letter addresses
Some letter addresses are used only in milling or only in turning; most are used in both. Bold below are the letters seen most frequently throughout a program.

Sources: Smid 2008; Smid 2010; Green et al. 1996.

List of G-codes commonly found on FANUC and similarly designed controls for milling and turning

Sources: Smid 2008; Smid 2010; Green et al. 1996.

Note: Modal means a code stays in effect until replaced, or cancelled, by another permitted code.  Non-Modal means it executes only once. See, for example, codes G09, G61 & G64 below.

List of M-codes commonly found on FANUC and similarly designed controls for milling and turning

Sources: Smid 2008; Smid 2010; Green et al. 1996.

Some older controls require M codes to be in separate blocks (that is, not on the same line).

Example program
This is a generic program that demonstrates the use of G-Code to turn a part that is 1" diameter by 1" long. Assume that a bar of material is in the machine and that the bar is slightly oversized in length and diameter and that the bar protrudes by more than 1" from the face of the chuck. (Caution: This is generic, it might not work on any real machine! Pay particular attention to point 5 below.)

Several points to note:
 There is room for some programming style, even in this short program. The grouping of codes in line  could have been put on multiple lines. Doing so may have made it easier to follow program execution.
 Many codes are modal, meaning they remain in effect until cancelled or replaced by a contradictory code. For example, once variable speed cutting (CSS) had been selected, it stays in effect until the end of the program. In operation, the spindle speed increases as the tool near the center of the work to maintain constant surface speed. Similarly, once rapid feed is selected, all tool movements are rapid until a feed rate code is selected.
 It is common practice to use a load monitor with CNC machinery. The load monitor stops the machine if the spindle or feed loads exceed a preset value that is set during the set-up operation. The jobs of the load monitor are various:
 Prevent machine damage in the event of tool breakage or a programming mistake.
 This is especially important because it allows safe "lights-out machining", in which the operators set up the job and start it during the day, then go home for the night, leaving the machines running and cutting parts during the night. Because no human is around to hear, see, or smell a problem such as a broken tool, the load monitor serves an important sentry duty. When it senses overload condition, which semantically suggests a dull or broken tool, it commands a stop to the machining. Technology is available nowadays to send an alert to someone remotely (e.g., the sleeping owner, operator, or owner-operator) if desired, which can allow them to come to intercede and get production going again, then leave once more. This can be the difference between profitability or loss on some jobs because lights-out machining reduces labor hours per part.
 Warn of a tool that is becoming dull and must be replaced or sharpened. Thus, an operator tending multiple machines is told by a machine, essentially, "Pause what you're doing over there, and come attend to something over here."
 It is common practice to bring the tool in rapidly to a "safe" point that is close to the part—in this case, 0.1" away—and then start feeding the tool. How close that "safe" distance is, depends on the preference of the programmer and/or operator and the maximum material condition for the raw stock.
 If the program is wrong, there is a high probability that the machine will crash, or ram the tool into the part, vice, or machine under high power.  This can be costly, especially in newer machining centers. It is possible to intersperse the program with optional stops ( code) that let the program run piecemeal for testing purposes.  The optional stops remain in the program but are skipped during normal running. Fortunately, most CAD/CAM software ships with CNC simulators that display the movement of the tool as the program executes. Nowadays the surrounding objects (chuck, clamps, fixture, tailstock, and more) are included in the 3D models, and the simulation is much like an entire video game or virtual reality environment, making unexpected crashes much less likely. 
Many modern CNC machines also allow programmers to execute the program in a simulation mode and observe the operating parameters of the machine at a particular execution point.  This enables programmers to discover semantic errors (as opposed to syntax errors) before losing material or tools to an incorrect program.  Depending on the size of the part, wax blocks may be used for testing purposes as well. Additionally, many machines support operator overrides for both rapid and feed rate that can be used to reduce the speed of the machine, allowing operators to stop program execution before a crash occurs.
 The line numbers that have been included in the program above (i.e.  ... ) are usually not necessary for the operation of a machine and increase file sizes, so they are seldom used in the industry. However, if branching or looping statements are used in the code, then line numbers may well be included as the target of those statements (e.g. ).
 Some machines do not allow multiple M codes in the same line.

Programming environments

G-code's programming environments have evolved in parallel with those of general programming—from the earliest environments (e.g., writing a program with a pencil, typing it into a tape puncher) to the latest environments that combine CAD (computer-aided design), CAM (computer-aided manufacturing), and richly featured G-code editors. (G-code editors are analogous to XML editors, using colors and indents semantically [plus other features] to aid the user in ways that basic text editors can't. CAM packages are analogous to IDEs in general programming.)

Two high-level paradigm shifts have been toward:

 abandoning "manual programming" (with nothing but a pencil or text editor and a human mind) for CAM software systems that generate G-code automatically via postprocessors (analogous to the development of visual techniques in general programming)
 abandoning hardcoded constructs for parametric ones (analogous to the difference in general programming between hardcoding a constant into an equation versus declaring it a variable and assigning new values to it at will; and to the object-oriented approach in general). 

Macro (parametric) CNC programming uses human-friendly variable names, relational operators, and loop structures, much as general programming does, to capture information and logic with machine-readable semantics. Whereas older manual CNC programming could only describe particular instances of parts in numeric form, macro programming describes abstractions that can easily apply in a wide variety of instances. 

The tendency is comparable to a computer programming evolution from low-level programming languages to high-level ones.

STEP-NC reflects the same theme, which can be viewed as yet another step along a path that started with the development of machine tools, jigs and fixtures, and numerical control, which all sought to "build the skill into the tool." Recent developments of G-code and STEP-NC aim to build the information and semantics into the tool. This idea is not new; from the beginning of numerical control, the concept of an end-to-end CAD/CAM environment was the goal of such early technologies as DAC-1 and APT. Those efforts were fine for huge corporations like GM and Boeing. However, small and medium enterprises went through an era of simpler implementations of NC, with relatively primitive "connect-the-dots" G-code and manual programming until CAD/CAM improved and disseminated throughout the industry.

Any machine tool with a great number of axes, spindles, and tool stations is difficult to program well manually. It has been done over the years, but not easily. This challenge has existed for decades in CNC screw machine and rotary transfer programming, and it now also arises with today's newer machining centers called "turn-mills", "mill-turns", "multitasking machines", and "multifunction machines". Now that CAD/CAM systems are widely used, CNC programming (such as with G-code) requires CAD/CAM (as opposed to manual programming) to be practical and competitive in the market segments these classes of machines serve. As Smid says, "Combine all these axes with some additional features, and the amount of knowledge required to succeed is quite overwhelming, to say the least." At the same time, however, programmers still must thoroughly understand the principles of manual programming and must think critically and second-guess some aspects of the software's decisions.

Since about the mid-2000s, it seems "the death of manual programming" (that is, of writing lines of G-code without CAD/CAM assistance) may be approaching. However, it is currently only in some contexts that manual programming is obsolete. Plenty of CAM programming takes place nowadays among people who are rusty on, or incapable of, manual programming—but it is not true that all CNC programming can be done, or done as well or as efficiently, without knowing G-code. Tailoring and refining the CNC program at the machine is an area of practice where it can be easier or more efficient to edit the G-code directly rather than editing the CAM toolpaths and re-post-processing the program.

Making a living cutting parts on computer-controlled machines has been made both easier and harder by CAD/CAM software. Efficiently written G-code can be a challenge for CAM software. Ideally, a CNC machinist should know both manual and CAM programming well so that the benefits of both brute-force CAM and elegant hand programming can be used where needed.  Many older machines were built with limited computer memory at a time when memory was very expensive; 32K was considered plenty of room for manual programs whereas modern CAM software can post gigabytes of code. CAM excels at getting a program out quickly that may take up more machine memory and take longer to run. This often makes it quite valuable to machining a low quantity of parts. But a balance must be struck between the time it takes to create a program and the time the program takes to machine a part. It has become easier and faster to make just a few parts on the newer machines with much memory. This has taken its toll on both hand programmers and manual machinists. Given natural turnover into retirement, it is not realistic to expect to maintain a large pool of operators who are highly skilled in manual programming when their commercial environment mostly can no longer provide the countless hours of deep experience it took to build that skill; and yet the loss of this experience base can be appreciated, and there are times when such a pool is sorely missed because some CNC or 3D printing runs still cannot be optimized without such skill.

Abbreviations used by programmers and operators
This list is only a selection and, except for a few key terms, mostly avoids duplicating the many abbreviations listed at engineering drawing abbreviations and symbols.

See also
 3D printing
 Canned cycle
 LinuxCNC - a free CNC software with many resources for G-code documentation
 Drill file
 HP-GL
 STL (file format)
 Slicer (3D printing)

Extended developments
Direct Numerical Control (DNC)
STEP-NC
MTConnect

Similar concepts
Gerber file

Concerns during application
Cutter location, cutter compensation, offset parameters
Coordinate systems

References

Bibliography

External links
 CNC G-Code and M-Code Programming
 
 http://museum.mit.edu/150/86  Has several links (including history of MIT Servo Lab)
 Complete list of G-code used by most 3D printers
 Fanuc and Haas G-code Reference
 Fanuc and Haas G-code Tutorial
 Haas Milling Manual
 G Code For Lathe & Milling
 M Code for Lathe & Milling

Computer-aided engineering
Domain-specific programming languages
Encodings
Metalworking